Djehutynakht, tentatively identified with Djehutynakht IV or Djehutynakht V, was an ancient Egyptian "Overlord of the Hare nome" (the 15th nome of Upper Egypt) during the very end of the 11th Dynasty or the early 12th Dynasty (21st-20th century BCE). He is well known for his painted outer coffin (commonly called the “Bersha coffin”) now exhibited in the Museum of Fine Arts, Boston along with his other grave goods.

Biography

Once believed to have lived during the reign of pharaoh Senusret III of the 12th Dynasty, from the analysis of his furniture it has been deducted that he actually lived in an earlier period, although a degree of uncertainty still remains: it is very difficult to trace Djehutynakht's family and life events, and the only certain relationship it that with his wife, also named Djehutynakht. The name was very common in this period and six nomarchs bearing it are known, two of whom – the fourth and the fifth respectively – were married to a wife with the same name.
If this nomarch was the same of Djehutynakht IV, then he lived at the very end of the 11th Dynasty and was the son of the nomarch Ahanakht I, successor of his brother Ahanakht II, and predecessor of the nomarch Neheri I. Otherwise, if he was the same of Djehutynakht V, then he lived during the late reign of pharaoh Amenemhat I of the 12th Dynasty and was Neheri I's son and successor by his wife Djehutyhotep, and the uncle of his successor Neheri II. In either cases, no children are known for Djehutynakht and his wife. See "Nomarchs of the Hare nome" for a complete genealogy.

Tomb 10A
Djehutynakht's tomb – designated 10A – was rediscovered in the Deir el-Bersha necropolis in Middle Egypt in 1915 by the American Egyptologist George Andrew Reisner who was the leader of the Harvard University – Boston Museum of Fine Arts expedition. Almost nothing was left of the outer chapel but the burial chamber, although already raided of the jewelry, still contained four finely painted cedar wood coffins belonged to Djehutynakht and his wife. His outer coffin, commonly called the “Bersha coffin”, is renowned as “the finest painted coffin Egypt produced and a masterpiece of panel painting”. In addition to the coffins, the tomb contained the nomarch's mummified head as well as lady Djehutynakht's canopic chest and a great quantity of funerary furniture such as pottery, canopic jars, several model boats, many models of men and women in different daily life activities, and the famous group composed of a priest and many offering girls, known as “Bersha procession”. In its entirety, these objects form the largest Middle Kingdom funerary assemblage ever found.

The Egyptian government gave the whole content of Tomb 10A to the Museum of Fine Arts. During the naval trip to Boston in 1920, the collection was threatened by a fire on board, but fortunately the damage was very limited. For decades only the “Bersha coffin” and the “Bersha procession” were exhibited at the MFA; in 2009–10 the whole collection was shown in a dedicated exhibition.

Gallery

References

Nomarchs
Officials of the Eleventh Dynasty of Egypt
Officials of the Twelfth Dynasty of Egypt
21st-century BC people
20th-century BC people
Museum of Fine Arts, Boston
1915 archaeological discoveries